The Treća nogometna liga, commonly Treća NL or 3. NL) is the fourth tier of the football league system. The league was reestablished in 2022 following the reconstruction of league system in Croatia. It is operated by the Croatian Football Federation.

History 
The fourth Croatian football league was played for the first time in 2006, after the merger of the 2. HNL - North and 2. HNL - South into a single 2. HNL. With the aforementioned changes, part of the clubs from the second league were relegated to the 3. HNL, and part of the clubs from the third leagues, together with the best clubs of the county leagues, formed the newly created groups of the 4. HNL. After the dissolution of the 4. HNL in 2012, inter-county football leagues corresponding to the previous groups of the 4th HNL were founded in some areas.

In earlier championships, the fourth class of football leagues was represented by the First County Football League, except in the 1995–96 seasons and in 1996–97, when with the creation of the 1. B HNL (which in reality represented the second class), the fourth competitive class was actually represented by the 3. HNL. In the 1994–95 season, there was also the 4. HNL, which was then created as a successor to the regional leagues, but did not survive for more than one season, and then functioned under that name only in the territory of Northern Croatia.

Format 
The competition takes place in five groups of up to eighteen (18) clubs according to the double point system, and the exact number of participants is determined by the competition regulations. From each group, the last placed club and as many asnecessary for the groups to number 16 clubs must be eliminated.

Groups are formed and managed in ​​the HNS regional centers:

 the center of Rijeka form the West group,

 the center of Zagreb form the Centar group,

 the center of Osijek form the East group,

 the center of Varaždin form the North group,

 the center of Split form the South group.

Champions

References

External links 

 Third League East at the website of Croatian Football Federation
 Third League South at the website of Croatian Football Federation
 Third League North at the website of Croatian Football Federation
 Third League Center at the website of Croatian Football Federation
 Third League West at the website of Croatian Football Federation

4
Fourth level football leagues in Europe
Professional sports leagues in Croatia